The Chinese false-eyed turtle (Cuora trifasciata × Sacalia quadriocellata) is a hybrid species of turtle in the family Geoemydidae. It is a hybrid between a male golden coin turtle (Cuora trifasciata) and a female four-eyed turtle (Sacalia quadriocellata). While formerly considered to be a wild type species believed to be originally from Hainan, it is now known only from pet trade type specimens.

References

 (2005): On the hybridisation between two distantly related Asian turtles (Testudines: Sacalia × Mauremys). Salamandra 41: 21–26. PDF fulltext
  (2001): New Chinese turtles: endangered or invalid? A reassessment of two species using mitochondrial DNA, allozyme electrophoresis and known-locality specimens. Animal Conservation 4(4): 357–367. HTML abstract Erratum: Animal Conservation 5(1): 86 HTML abstract

Reptiles of China
Sacalia
Taxonomy articles created by Polbot
Hybrid animals
Intergeneric hybrids